BLITS may refer to:
 Black & Lane's Ident Tones for Surround,  a way of keeping track of channels in a mixed surround-sound, stereo, and mono world. 
 BLITS (satellite), a Russian laser ranged satellite.